Pierre Dalle Nogare (22 December 1934, in Paris – 1984) was a French poet, novelist and playwright. In 1970, he was awarded the Prix Guillaume-Apollinaire for Corps imaginaire published by Flammarion.

Work

Collection of poems 
1957: Cellules, Gallimard
1962: L'autre hier, Gallimard
1967: Hauts-fonds, Flammarion
1969: Corps imaginaire, Flammarion
1970: Motrice,

Narrations 
1971: La Mort assise
1972: Déméter

Novel 
1974: Le Grand temps, Éditions Julliard

Play 
1958: Les Gusm

Adaptation 
He is also the author of an adaptation in "modern French" of Tristan and Iseult, with a preface by Alain Bosquet and 
illustrated with ten original engravings on copper by Lars Bo, Gisèle Celan-Lestrange, Gérard Diaz, Donatella,  et alii (Paris, Club du livre, 1985)

External links 
 Pierre Dalle Nogare on Babelio
 Pierre Dalle Nogare on Printemps des poètes

20th-century French poets
20th-century French novelists
1934 births
Writers from Paris
1984 deaths
Prix Guillaume Apollinaire winners